The Gardens of Murcia (French: Aux jardins de Murcie) is a 1936 French drama film directed by Marcel Gras and Max Joly and starring Juanita Montenegro, Hubert Prélier and Geymond Vital. It was also known by the alternative title of Heritage. A 1923 silent film The Gardens of Murcia had earlier been made, based on the same story.

Cast
 Juanita Montenegro as Maria del Carmen  
 Hubert Prélier as Xavier  
 Geymond Vital as Pencho 
 Nicolas Amato 
 Albert Angeli as Pepuso  
 Marcel Charvey 
 Jean Clairval 
 Irma d'Argy 
 Henry Darbray 
 Marcel Delaître as Domingo  
 Mona Dol 
 Annette Doria as Fuensantica 
 Geno Ferny 
 L.E. Hemme 
 Edmée Landauer
 Raymond Marcel 
 Georges Mauloy as Le médecin  
 André Pierrel 
 Annie Toinon

References

Bibliography 
 Crisp, Colin. Genre, Myth and Convention in the French Cinema, 1929-1939. Indiana University Press, 2002.

External links 
 

1936 films
1936 drama films
French drama films
1930s French-language films
Remakes of French films
Sound film remakes of silent films
Films set in Spain
French black-and-white films
1930s French films